Yuthana Thonglek (born 13 January 1967) is a Thai sprinter. He competed in the men's 4 × 400 metres relay at the 1992 Summer Olympics.

References

1967 births
Living people
Athletes (track and field) at the 1992 Summer Olympics
Yuthana Thonglek
Yuthana Thonglek
Place of birth missing (living people)
Athletes (track and field) at the 1994 Asian Games
Yuthana Thonglek
Asian Games medalists in athletics (track and field)
Medalists at the 1994 Asian Games
Yuthana Thonglek
Yuthana Thonglek